North Sydney Boys High School (abbreviated as NSBHS) is a government-funded, single-sex, academically selective secondary day school for boys, located at Crows Nest, on the Lower North Shore of Sydney, New South Wales, Australia. In 2022, North Sydney Boys High School ranked as the second high school in the state, based on the percentage of exams sat that achieved a Distinguished Achievers (DA).

History 
North Sydney Boys began off-site in temporary classes in 1912, as North Sydney Intermediate High School, which was located in Blue Street. At the beginning of 1915, the new school on the corner of Falcon Street and Miller Street, Crows Nest was opened to 214 students. The School chose the Falcon as its mascot as well as its logo according to the location of the school on Falcon Street, even going as far as to name its Old Boys Alumni "Old Falconians" in 1933. After years of controversy, it was decided to celebrate the centenary in 2012.

The first headmaster was Nimrod Greenwood. He had been headmaster of the North Sydney Superior School before the establishment of the High School and had 33 years of service as Headmaster of the two schools. On his retirement in 1915, he was succeeded by Charles Rattray Smith who had founded Newcastle High School and was to go to head Sydney High School in 1918. Smith was succeeded by the headmaster who had replaced him at Newcastle High School, William Williams, who guided the school for the next 13 years. On his promotion to Inspector, Williams was succeeded by the then Headmaster of Newcastle Boys High School, RF Harvey, in 1932; Harvey was head until his death in 1947.

Following its closure in 1969, students from North Sydney Technical High School were transferred to NSBHS.

Academic Results 
North Sydney Boys High School has consistently achieved outstanding academic results in both the National Assessment Program Literacy and Numeracy (NAPLAN) and Higher School Certificate (HSC) assessments. The school has regularly placed well above average against all Australian students as well as students with a similar background in NAPLAN examinations. North Sydney Boys has ranked within the top 5 schools in New South Wales by the percentage of examinations sat that achieved a distinguished achievers for the past decade.

HSC 
The table below shows the school's HSC ranking relative to other schools in NSW.

Crows Nest campus 
It also borders residential and commercial retail properties on West Street and Falcon Street. There are a number of mature native and exotic trees with some shrubs. The built environment comprises classrooms, library, amenities, assembly hall, administration and gymnasium, various courtyards, playground areas, tennis courts, car parking, cricket practice nets and an open waste storage area.

History 
Construction began on the first building on the Crows Nest campus in 1913 on contract by John Brown whose tender price was £7770 "on much the same lines" as North Sydney Girls High School, whose construction was then underway. In August 1914, the Sydney Morning Herald reported that the "Girls' High School at North Sydney has been completed and occupied, while the buildings for the Boys' High School are being erected ... on the most modern lines, while the accommodation and fittings will be ample, and up to date." By the end of December 1914, Sydney Morning Herald could report that the "Boys' High School at North Sydney is being erected by day labour at an estimated cost of £7900. It consists of a two-story brick building, with stone facings, and provides eight classrooms and staff rooms. The science and manual training rooms are detached."

Around 1920 the site expanded and the Arts/TAS building dates from this time. In or about 1953 a library and administration block were erected. In or about 1968 science and classroom blocks were added. The gymnasium dates from 1962.

Recent building works 
North Sydney Boys High School is undergoing a major capital building program funded by the State and Federal Governments.

In DA1, completed in about 2003, the Keele Street Lawn area was acquired and refurbished. In DA2, completed in 2005, new tennis courts and other building works were carried out. A new building that includes music rehearsal spaces, visual art classrooms and design and technology workshops have been finished in term 4 of 2006 and students have moved into the new building, now named 'J Block'. A dedicated music computer lab is also available in the new building.

The school community also completed a major upgrade of the AF Henry Hall in 2005 including the addition of a mezzanine, new ceiling, lighting, stage, and stage curtains. In 2007–2009 six science labs were completely refurbished costing over $1million.

In 2011, the School named the recently refurbished gymnasium in honour of Old Falconian John Treloar.

Construction of a new library completed in the end of 2013, and begun being used by students in 2014.

A completely parent and donation funded development of new outdoor tennis, basketball and futsal courts was completed and opened to students at the end of 2017. The project aimed to resolve shortages in adequate dedicated sporting facilities in the school, and replaced the worn out grass playing fields. Currently, requests have been made to increase the height of the fence surrounding the new facilities due to the frequency of sports equipment such as soccer balls clearing the fence ending up in the residencies adjacent.

Further refurbishment of the school gymnasium commenced in December 2019. The gymnasium was finished in 2020 and was made available in 2021 to students.

Old Falconians  

Former students of North Sydney Boys High School are known as 'Old Boys' or 'Old Falconians' and may elect to join the schools' alumni association, known as the 'Old Falconians’ Union' (OFU). The Union was founded over seventy-five years ago as a way to "promote goodwill fellowship amongst former students of and to provide financial and other support to the School".

In 2010 The Age reported that North Sydney Boys High School alumni ranked equal seventh among Australian secondary school alumni based on the number of alumni who had received a "top" Order of Australia above Scotch College, Melbourne, Geelong Grammar School, Sydney Boys High School, Fort Street High School, Perth Modern School, St Peter's College, Adelaide, Melbourne Grammar School, and The King's School, Parramatta, Launceston Grammar School, Melbourne High School, Wesley College, Melbourne and Xavier College.

Sir Ralph Darling, Headmaster of Geelong High School, paid a tribute to the school in 1988 in the following terms: "... Melbourne High, North Sydney High, is just as good or better than any private school."

Gallery

See also 

 North Sydney Girls High School
 List of government schools in New South Wales
 List of selective high schools in New South Wales

Notes
  Who's Who of boys' school rankings: 1. The King's School, Parramatta, 2.Melbourne Grammar School, 3. Melbourne High School, 4. Geelong Grammar School, 5. Sydney Boys High School, 6. Wesley College, 7. Shore, 8. Fort Street Boys' High, 9. North Sydney Boys High School, 10. Sydney Grammar School

References

External links 

 

1912 establishments in Australia
Boys' schools in New South Wales
Educational institutions established in 1912
North Sydney, New South Wales
Public high schools in Sydney
Selective schools in New South Wales